The Washington Literary Society and Debating Union (also known as "the Washington Society" or "the Wash") is a literary and debating group at the University of Virginia in Charlottesville. While its current incarnation is modern, the society has roots back to the first decade of operation of the University and was founded in the mid-1830s.

The Washington Society operates under the constitution of the original Society and asserts its status as legitimate successor. The constitution, as it existed in 1929, required that the induction of new members be conducted by existing members. The refounding of the Society was made possible by Mr. R. E. Heischman of Charlottesville, an active member of the Washington Society from 1923 until 1925, who administered the oath of membership on the night of November 16.

Events

The Washington Society generally meets on Thursdays at 8pm when classes are in session at the University of Virginia in Hotel C of the University's West Range, known colloquially as "Jefferson Hall," due to the fact that Hotel C is technically controlled by Jefferson Literary and Debating Society. Special meetings, such as the inaugural meeting every semester, may be held in other locations to accommodate for new member interest. Meetings generally consist of several literary presentations and a debate between two teams. Literary presentations and debates range from humorous discussions to serious readings or reenactments of plays, dramas, poems, stories, and the like.

Membership in the Washington Society is open to any current student at the University of Virginia. By signing the roll of the Washington Society, a student declares their intent to join and becomes a provisional member for a semester. Provisional members are required to complete a literary presentation and debate in front of the Society as well as perform an act of service. When a provisional member fulfills the requirements for membership, they are inducted into the Society as regular members. The Society may also grant honorary memberships to community members who have provided exceptional service to the Society.

The Washington Society also participates in three annual debates with the Jefferson Society. The Ethics Debate is held in the fall semester and addresses questions of ethical decision-making. The Harrison Cup is a humorous debate held in the fall semester. The Smith Simpson Debate on Foreign Policy is held between the two groups on a question of foreign policy in the spring and was endowed by R. Smith Simpson. The Smith Simpson Debate occurs in the Dome Room of the Rotunda.

In addition to participating in inter-society debates, the Washington Society works to promote speech and debate more broadly. The Society hosts two literary competitions for University of Virginia students with a cash prize awarded to the winner. The Society used to sponsor an annual book drive and help coordinate a middle school debate club at Burley Middle School in Charlotteville. The Society used to jointly host a high school debate tournament alongside the American Parliamentary Debate Association organization at the University in February.

History
The Washington Society was founded sometime in the years from 1834 to 1836 from the merger of two earlier societies, the Academics and The Association for Mutual Improvement in the Art of Oratory. Like other student activities in the early years of the University, its interactions with the faculty were turbulent, at one point leading the Board of Visitors to forbid students from delivery of public speeches.

A Literary society in nature, from the beginning the group utilized the name "Washington Literary Society" in popular parlance, but less often, and in certain contexts used its Greek letter name Sigma Beta Phi ( or ). Eventually the group settled in to use its nickname, "The Wash".

In its early years, the society was active in University affairs with a literary focus, co-sponsoring from 1847 to 1851 (with the Jefferson Literary and Debating Society, the Philomethean, and Aesculapian Societies) a literary magazine called the Jefferson Monument Magazine, whose purpose was both to raise funds for a memorial to the University's founder and to provide a literary outlet for the students. Following the collapse of the Jefferson Monument Magazine, the society co-sponsored the University Magazine with the Philomathean and Jefferson Societies, beginning in 1851.

Like many student organizations at the University, the Washington Society was politically active in the secessionist cause in the years prior to the American Civil War. A resolution that had been in place since 1858 to avoid debate questions that "would bring up any of the political issues now distracting the country" was lifted in January 1860, and the society subsequently debated the questions of a state's right to secede (answering in the affirmative) and whether Virginia should secede from the union if Lincoln were elected president (also answering in the affirmative). In 1861, after the secession of Virginia from the Union, the Society voted to send its surplus treasury (about $200) to the Governor of the Commonwealth for the defense of the state.

All student activities, including the Washington Society, were suspended from 1861 through 1865 for the duration of the Civil War, but the Washington Society was the first to reactivate, holding its first postbellum meeting on October 14, 1865. The Society cooperated with the Jefferson Society in raising money for the erection of a memorial to the University's Confederate casualties in the University Cemetery.

In 1913, the Washington Society joined forces again with the Jefferson Society to sponsor a "speaking league" for public and private high school students throughout the state. However, the activity of the society subsequently fell off until it completely died out during the 1920s. Briefly reforming in 1939 as a society with the aim of "encouraging intellectual curiosity, gentlemanliness, congeniality and the idealization of the Virginia gentleman," it soon became extinct again until its modern refounding in 1979.

In 1979, Three members of the Jefferson Society, J. Mitchell Aberman, Stephen L. Huntoon, and Josiah (Josh) Hensen, reestablished the Washington Society with the help of Richard Nichols Randolph, who was initiated into The Washington Society over the phone by R.E. Heischmen. Randolph then alters the constitution to allow members from the Jefferson Society to join; Randolph inducts the other three, who become the Second Refounders. A year later, in 1980, Leslie Eliason, the first female president and fifth member, established or reestablished most of the traditions that continue today, including Thursday meetings in Jeff Hall, and debates with the Jefferson Society.

Washington Hall
The Washington Society was without permanent meeting facilities from 1842 to 1849, when they were granted a room in Hotel B, where they remained through much of the 19th century. In 1852, the Society asked for permission to enlarge its room in Hotel B; University historian Philip Alexander Bruce notes that this was the origin of the use of the name Washington Hall to describe these chambers. In 1869, the reorganized society expanded the hall to its current dimensions. In the year 1896, following the burning of the Rotunda and the destruction of the Annex, law classes were held in Washington Hall. The University took possession of the Hall sometime after 1929 when there was no Society to maintain the building. Washington Hall now houses the University of Virginia's Office for Equal Opportunity and Civil Rights.

Notable members
 John S. Mosby
 Paula Xinis
 Mortimer Caplin
 Robert Kent Gooch
 Hardy Cross Dillard
 Armistead Mason Dobie

Related
 : Cambridge Union Society
 : Oxford Union Society
 : The Durham Union Society
 : London School of Economics, Grimshaw International Relations Club
 : Yale Debate Association
 : Berkeley Forum
 : Jefferson Literary and Debating Society
 : Olivaint Conférence
 : Studentenforum im Tönissteiner Kreis
 : Olivaint Conference of Belgium

Notes and references

External links
Official Web Site: Washington Literary Society and Debating Union
University of Virginia	

University of Virginia
Student debating societies
College literary societies in the United States
1831 establishments in Virginia